Hasteh Kuh may refer to:
 Hasteh Kuh, Hormozgan
 Hasteh Kuh, Kohgiluyeh and Boyer-Ahmad